Trevor Geoffrey Bull (28 December 1944 – 4 April 2009) was a British cyclist.

Cycling career
He competed in the team pursuit at the 1964 Summer Olympics. He also represented England and won a bronze medal in the 10 mile scratch race, at the 1966 British Empire and Commonwealth Games in Kingston, Jamaica.

Bull was a four times British track champion, winning the British National Individual Sprint Championships in 1975, two Madison titles (1969 & 1970) with Tony Gowland and a team pursuit title (1965).

References

1944 births
2009 deaths
British male cyclists
Olympic cyclists of Great Britain
Cyclists at the 1964 Summer Olympics
Sportspeople from Birmingham, West Midlands
Commonwealth Games medallists in cycling
Commonwealth Games bronze medallists for England
Cyclists at the 1966 British Empire and Commonwealth Games
20th-century British people
Medallists at the 1966 British Empire and Commonwealth Games